Howard's Neck Plantation is a historic house and plantation complex located near the unincorporated community of Pemberton, in Goochland County, Virginia.  It was built about 1825, and is a two-story, three-bay brick structure in the Federal style. The house is similar in style to the works of Robert Mills.  It has a shallow deck-on-hip roof and a small, one-story academically proportioned tetrastyle Roman Doric order portico.

Also on the property are other contributing buildings: A one-story frame house, said to be the original farm dwelling dating from colonial times; a 20th-century frame house, an early 19th-century brick kitchen, two frame smokehouses, a frame tool house, two early carriage houses and a harness house, three log slave quarters, the manager's house, and a sizable tobacco barn.

It was listed on the National Register of Historic Places in 1972.

References

Plantation houses in Virginia
Houses on the National Register of Historic Places in Virginia
Farms on the National Register of Historic Places in Virginia
Federal architecture in Virginia
Houses completed in 1825
Houses in Goochland County, Virginia
National Register of Historic Places in Goochland County, Virginia
Slave cabins and quarters in the United States